Zásmuky is a town in Kolín District in the Central Bohemian Region of the Czech Republic. It has about 2,100 inhabitants.

Administrative parts
Villages of Doubravčany, Nesměň, Sobočice and Vršice are administrative parts of Zásmuky.

Notable people
František Kmoch (1848–1912), composer and conductor

References

Cities and towns in the Czech Republic